Sefkerin is a village in Serbia. It is situated in the Opovo municipality, in the South Banat District, Vojvodina province. The village has a Serb ethnic majority  and its population numbering 2,522 people (2011 census).

Historical population

1961: 3,028
1971: 2,837
1981: 2,836
1991: 2,717

See also
List of places in Serbia
List of cities, towns and villages in Vojvodina

Populated places in Serbian Banat
Populated places in South Banat District
Opovo